Savannah or Savanna is a type of grassland.

Savannah or Savanna may also refer to:

Film and television
 Savannah (film), a 2013 family history drama film
Savannah (TV series), a television soap opera
 Savannah, a character in Jay Jay the Jet Plane

Military operations
 Operation Savanna, a World War II Operation
 Operation Savannah (Angola), a South African military operation into Angola

Music
 Savanna, a UK jazz/funk band featuring Orphy Robinson
 "Savanna", a 2010 song by The Thrillseekers
 "Savannah", a song by Relient K from Forget and Not Slow Down

People
 Savannah (actress) (1970–1994), American pornographic actress
 Angela Fong or Savannah (born 1985), wrestler

Places
 Savannah, Queensland, a locality in the Shire of Carpentaria, Queensland, Australia
 Savanna-la-Mar, the capital of Westmoreland Parish, Jamaica
 Savana, a town and commune in Madagascar
 Savannah, Georgia, United States
 Savannah River, a river and natural border between Georgia and South Carolina, United States
 Savannah River Site, a nuclear facility in South Carolina located near Augusta, Georgia
 Port of Savannah, a seaport
 Savannah station (Amtrak), a rail facility
 Savannah, California, a former town and neighborhood of Camp El Monte, a rebel base in the Civil War
 Savanna School District
 Savanna High School, a high school in Orange County
 Savanna, Illinois
 Palo Alto, Mississippi or Savannah
 Savannah, Missouri
 Savannah, Nebraska
 Savannah, New York, a town in Wayne County, New York
 Savannah (CDP), New York, a hamlet and census-designated place in Wayne County, New York
 Savannah, North Carolina
 Savannah, Ohio
 Savannah Town, South Carolina, a historic settlement near Augusta, Georgia
 Savannah, Tennessee
 Savannah, Texas

Ships
 SS Savannah, the first steamship to cross the Atlantic Ocean, in 1819
 CSS Savannah (gunboat), a sidewheel steamer converted to a gunboat in 1861
 CSS Savannah (ironclad), an ironclad ram launched in 1863
 NS Savannah, a nuclear-powered merchant ship
 USS Savannah (AOR-4), a US Navy Wichita-class replenishment oiler
 USS Savannah (CL-42), a US Navy Brooklyn-class light cruiser

Other uses
 Tropical savanna climate, climate type characterized by mild temperatures, and a dry season
Savannah (given name), a feminine given name
 Savanna (owarai), a Japanese comedic duo
 GNU Savannah, an aggregation of software development projects affiliated with the GNU project
 GMC Savana, a large van
 ICP Savannah, an ultralight aircraft manufactured in Italy
 Mazda Savanna, the Japanese market name for the Mazda RX-3, and the Mazda RX-7 car
 Savanna, a private game reserve in Sabi Sabi, South Africa
 Savanna, a doll in the Groovy Girls doll line by Manhattan toy
 Cyclone Savannah, a strong tropical cyclone in the Indian Ocean in 2018
 Savannah palm (Sabal mauritiiformis), a palm tree species

See also
 "Blue Savannah", a 1990 song by Erasure
 Savanna Dry, a brand of cider
 Savannah cat, a breed of cat
 Savannah monitor, a lizard
 Savannah Township (disambiguation) (multiple places)
 Siege of Savannah, a battle in the American Revolutionary War